César Augusto Quintero (born November 16, 1982 in Chitré, Herrera Province, Panama) is a former minor league baseball catcher who is most notable for playing for Panama in the 2006 World Baseball Classic and 2009 World Baseball Classics.

He began his professional career in 2001, playing in the Venezuelan Summer League, hitting .253. In 2002, he hit .319 and slugged .524 while playing in the VSL. He played for the AZL Mariners and Inland Empire 66ers in 2003, hitting a combined .321 in 31 games. He hit only .250 in seven games for the AZL Mariners in 2004.

Quintero had one at-bat in the 2006 World Baseball Classic, grounding into a double play. He also had one at-bat in the 2009 World Baseball Classic - he struck out.

References

1982 births
Living people
2006 World Baseball Classic players
2009 World Baseball Classic players
Baseball players at the 2007 Pan American Games
Baseball players at the 2011 Pan American Games
Pan American Games competitors for Panama
Panamanian expatriate baseball players in the United States
People from Chitré
Inland Empire 66ers of San Bernardino players
Arizona League Mariners players